5th Street or Fifth Street may refer to:

Roads and bridges
 5th Street (Manhattan), an east–west street in Lower Manhattan
 5th Street (Philadelphia), one of the boundaries of Independence Mall 
 5th Street (St. Louis), officially known as Broadway
 5th Street (Washington, D.C.)
 Fifth Street Viaduct, officially the Curtis Holt Sr. Bridge, in Richmond, Virginia

Places
 5th Street Gym, a boxing gym in Miami Beach, Florida
 Fifth Street, Texas, a community in United States
 Fifth Street Bluff Historic District, a national historic district in Ottumwa, Iowa
 Fifth Street Historic District, a national historic district in Lynchburg, Virginia
 Fifth Street Towers, a two-building complex in Minneapolis, Minnesota
 East Fifth Street Historic District (East Liverpool, Ohio), a national historic district

Other
 Fifth street, the final card dealt in a poker hand
 Fifth Street Asset Management, an American asset management company

See also
 5th Street station (disambiguation), train stations with this name
 Fifth Street Bridge (disambiguation)
 Fifth Avenue (disambiguation)